Simplicio of Zaragoza was a 6th-century Bishop of Zaragoza.
He was consecrated about 586AD, after the death of the Visigoth King Liuvigild.
 
He attended the Council of Toledo, (589AD). 
Some authors  also make him a participant in the second Council of Zaragoza (592AD), where there is a mention of Bishop Simplicio de Urgell. Others bring forward his entry into the diocese to 584 attributing to him a role in the conversion of King Leovigild to Catholicism.

References

592 deaths
Archbishops of Zaragoza
Archbishops of Valencia